Knopper  is a surname. Notable people with the surname include:

 Klaus Knopper (born 1968), German electrical engineer and free software developer
 Richard Knopper (born 1977), Dutch football player

See also
 Knoppers
 Knepper
 Knopper gall, a gall that develops on pedunculate oak trees